The 2008 PartyPoker.com Premier League was a professional non-ranking snooker tournament that was played from 11 September to 7 December 2008.

Ronnie O'Sullivan won in the final 7–2 against Mark Selby.


League phase

Top four qualified for the play–offs. If points were level then most frames won determined their positions. If two players had an identical record then the result in their match determined their positions. If that ended 3–3 then the player who got to four first was higher. (Breaks above 50 shown between (parentheses); century breaks are indicated with bold.)

 11 September – Grimsby Auditorium, Grimsby, England
 Mark Selby 4–2 Ding Junhui → 51–64, 15–105 (100), (86)–0, (80)–0, (73)–0, (104)–0
 Ronnie O'Sullivan 3–3 John Higgins → (62) 63–70, 1–91 (83), (72) 98–0, (85)–0, 67–42, 0–(74)
 18 September – The Anvil, Basingstoke, England
 John Higgins 3–3 Ding Junhui → 43–64, 47–68, 46–82 (76), (57) 59–15, (50) 68–58 (50), (78)–4
 Ronnie O'Sullivan 2–4 Joe Perry → 44–59, 6–105 (50,55), 0–(103), 63–47, (58) 90–0, 31–57
 25 September – Assembly Rooms, Derby, England
  Joe Perry 4–2 Steve Davis → 45–77, (80) 85–8, (67) 75–27, (55) 61–0, 63–45, 30–94 (65)
 Mark Selby 5–1 Stephen Hendry → 82–4, 77–9, 76–66, (50) 79–8, 1–75 (52), 67–64
 9 October – Malvern Theatres, Great Malvern, England
 Ronnie O'Sullivan 6–0 Ding Junhui → 63–56, (134) 134–0, (65) 66–1, (53) 70–31, (71)–30, (126)–0
 Mark Selby 6–0 Steve Davis → 68–36, (95)–3, 66–43, (80) 113–7, 73–49, (101)–0
 23 October – Plymouth Pavilions, Plymouth, England
 Ronnie O'Sullivan 6–0 Steve Davis → 103–7, (60) 97–25, (52) 71–38, (62) 113–0, 63–22, 93–0
 Stephen Hendry 1–5 Joe Perry → 31–(75), 12–62, 72–9, 1–(108), 53–71(65), 10–75(66)
 30 October – English Institute of Sport, Sheffield, England
 Stephen Hendry 4–2 John Higgins → (76)–7, (65) 72–40, 24–61 (56), 65–12, 68–61 (56), 25–60 (52)
 Ronnie O'Sullivan 3–3 Mark Selby → (75) 121–10, 60–56, 41–64, (64) 71–28, 5–98, 19–94 (94)
 6 November – Newport Centre, Newport, Wales
 Joe Perry 2–4 Ding Junhui → (50)–85 (70), 4–97, 0–82, (85)–5, 0–80, (90)–0
 Steve Davis 1–5 Stephen Hendry → 37–54, 0–84 (78), 75–54, 48–75, 32–78 (72), 37–86 (86)
 13 November – Dolphin Leisure Centre, Haywards Heath, England
 Ding Junhui 4–2 Steve Davis → (139)–0, (72) 103–32, (78) 104–0, (56) 92–4, 1–74 (70), 18–69
 Mark Selby 4–2 John Higgins → (102)–0, 37–82, (55) 72–46, (93) 94–32, 28–62 (60), (113) 126–0
 20 November – Sands Centre, Carlisle, England
 John Higgins 2–4 Joe Perry → 0–(72), 10–75, 36–81, 1–68, (120)–0, (76)–21
 Ronnie O'Sullivan 3–3 Stephen Hendry → 53–60, 1–109 (108), (67) 77–17, 37–73 (72), (68) 94–36, 66–42
 27 November – Glades Arena, Kidderminster, England
 Mark Selby 3–3 Joe Perry → (63) 91–3, 59–49, 80–22, 6–(115), 2–57, 22–66 (51)
 Stephen Hendry 3–3 Ding Junhui → 36–(85), (88)–1, 0–(113), (50) 69–12, 8–72, 69–13
 John Higgins 3–3 Steve Davis → 18–68, 8–57, 66–8, (73)–16, (69) 70–29, 37–67

Play-offs 
6–7 December – Potters Leisure Resort, Hopton-on-Sea, England

Semi-Final 1 – Mark Selby 5–0 Stephen Hendry 83–34, 110(110)–4, 133(128)–0, 115(115)–4, 77(77)–0 
Semi-Final 2 – Joe Perry 4–5 Ronnie O'Sullivan 55–68, 93(85)–0, 20–93(79), 76(72)–8, 24–93, 95(95)–0, 6–69(52), 100(100)–4, 4–104(104)
Final – Mark Selby 2–7 Ronnie O'Sullivan 11–121(93), 8–82(62), 18–74, 14–84(84), 48–83(62), 61–58, 13–105(105), 84(84)–0, 20–74(74)

Qualifiers

The qualification for this tournament, the Championship League was played in eight groups from 25 February to 15 May 2008.

Century breaks

 139, 113, 100  Ding Junhui
 134, 126, 105, 104  Ronnie O'Sullivan
 128, 120, 115, 110, 104, 102, 101  Mark Selby
 120  John Higgins
 115, 103, 101, 100  Joe Perry
 108  Stephen Hendry

References

2008
Premier League
Premier League Snooker